Punctoribatidae is a family of mites belonging to the order Sarcoptiformes.

Genera
Genera:
 Allomycobates Aoki, 1976
 Alpizetes Mahunka, 2001
 Cryptobothia Wallwork, 1963
 Ellipsozetes  Bernini, 1980 
 Feiderzetes  Subías, 1977 
 Inigozetes  Subías, 2000 
 Minguezetes  Subias, Kahwash & Ruiz, 1990 
 Minunthozetes  Hull, 1916 
 Mycobates  Hull, 1916 
 Mycozetes  Spain, 1968 
 Neomycobates  Wallwork, 1963 
 Paralamellobates  Bhaduri & Raychaudhuri, 1969 
 Pelopsis  Hall, 1911 
 Permycobates  Strenzke, 1954 
 Punctoribates  Berlese, 1908 
 Punctorites
 Schweizerzetes  Mahunka, 2001 
 Selvazetes  Behan-Pelletier, 1999 
 Semipunctoribates  Mahunka, 1987 
 Zachvatkinibates  Shaldybina, 1973

References

Sarcoptiformes